National Flag: Flag of Cape Verde

 Coat of Arms: Coat of Arms of Cape Verde

 Anthem: Cântico da Liberdade (Song of Freedom)
 Motto: Unidade, Luta, Progresso (Unity, Work, Progress)